Orbital foramen may refer to:

 Infraorbital foramen
 Zygomatico-orbital foramina